Group 4 of the 1970 FIFA World Cup was contested in León's Estadio Nou Camp between 2 and 11 June 1970. West Germany won the group, and advanced to the quarter-finals, along with Peru. Bulgaria and Morocco failed to advance.

Standings

Matches 
All times local (UTC−6)

Peru vs Bulgaria

West Germany vs Morocco

Peru vs Morocco

West Germany vs Bulgaria

West Germany vs Peru

Bulgaria vs Morocco

References 

Group 4
Group
G
G
Group